Sarcocystis nesbitti is a species of Apicomplexa.


Human infection

An outbreak investigation was conducted on 93 symptomatic persons from Malaysia following a college retreat on January 17–19, 2012, on Pangkor Island. Predominant manifestations were fever (relapsing in about 50% of patients), myalgia, headache, and cough. Although only two patients were confirmed to be acutely infected with S. nesbitti,  the remaining students and teachers in the group likely had the same infection, because nearly all had similar signs and symptoms with onset of illness within days of each other. In addition, 9 patients had a distinctive facial myositis, but sarcocysts could not be verified in all of them because only three patients agreed to provide a muscle biopsy specimen.

History of discovery
In 1843, Swiss scientist Friedrich Miescher found “milky white threads” in the muscles of a mouse, which for years were known as “Miescher’s tubules”. In 1882, Lankester named the parasite Sarcocystis, from the Greek sarx (flesh) and kystis (bladder). Scientists were unsure whether to classify the organisms as protozoa or as fungi because only the sarcocyst stage had been identified. In 1967, crescent-shaped structures typical of some parasitic protozoa were seen in sarcocyst cultures, and the organism was determined to be a protozoan, a close relative of Toxoplasma. In the early 1970s, the two-host lifecycle of Sarcocystis was actually elucidated. In 1969, A. M. Mandour described a new species of Sarcocystis in rhesus macaques, which he named Sarcocystis nesbitti, after Mr. P. Nesbitt, who saw the trophozoites in stained smears. Snakes are now known to be the definitive hosts of S. nesbitti, and several primates, including humans, can be intermediate hosts.

References 
 This article uses public domain text from the CDC as quoted.

Conoidasida
Rodent-carried diseases
Parasitic diseases
Parasites of equines
Parasites of mammals